Dramatic may refer to:

 Drama, a literary form involving parts for actors
 Dramatic, a voice type classification in European classical music, describing a specific vocal weight and range at the lower end of a given voice part
 Dramatic soprano, a strong voice which can be heard over an orchestra
 Dramatic (album), an album by Casiopea
 The Dramatics, 1960s American soul music vocal group
 "Dramatic", a 2019 song by the South Korean girl group Bvndit

See also
 Drama (disambiguation)
 Dramatica (disambiguation)